Succinipatopsis is an extinct onychophoran genus known from Eocene-aged Baltic amber.  The only known species described is Succinipatopsis balticus.

References

Monotypic protostome genera
Prehistoric onychophorans
Onychophoran genera
Onychophorans of Europe
Prehistoric protostome genera
Baltic amber
Fossil taxa described in 2000
Taxa named by George Poinar Jr.